Paige Parker (born 7 May 1995) is an Australian rules football and rugby league footballer who plays for the Brisbane Broncos in the NRL Women's Premiership. She previously played for Brisbane and the Gold Coast in the AFL Women's competition (AFLW), and the Newcastle Knights in the NRLW.

Early life
Parker was raised in Brisbane's northern suburb of Bracken Ridge to a family of Indigenous Australian (Quandamooka) descent. She attended St John Fisher College throughout her upbringing and excelled in touch football where she plays for the Brisbane Broncos and represents Australia at the World Cup level.

AFLW career
Parker made her debut for Brisbane in the round 1 game against Greater Western Sydney at Moreton Bay Central Sports Complex on 3 February 2019. Following the 2019 season, she joined the Gold Coast. After playing 13 games over two seasons, Parker was delisted by the Gold Coast in June 2021.

Rugby League career

On 3 December 2021, Parker was recruited by the Newcastle Knights to be a part of their inaugural NRL Women's Premiership squad.

In round 5 of the delayed 2021 NRL Women's season, Parker made her NRLW debut for the Knights against the Gold Coast Titans.

In June 2022, she signed with the Brisbane Broncos for the 2022 season.

References

External links
Newcastle Knights profile

1995 births
Living people
Sportspeople from Brisbane
Sportswomen from Queensland
Indigenous Australian players of Australian rules football
Australian rules footballers from Queensland
Brisbane Lions (AFLW) players
Gold Coast Football Club (AFLW) players
Newcastle Knights (NRLW) players
Touch footballers